Scelotes anguinus, the Algoa dwarf burrowing skink or Boulenger's burrowing skink, is a species of lizard which is endemic to South Africa. Note that the correct name for this species is anguinus. The name anguineus is a synonym of a different species Scelotes bipes.

References

anguineus
Reptiles of South Africa
Reptiles described in 1887
Taxa named by George Albert Boulenger